Road 93 is a road in south-west Iran connecting Chabahar to Nikshahr, Iranshahr and Kerman-Zahedan Road near Bam.

References

External links 

 Iran road map on Young Journalists Club

Roads in Iran